Ḥail Province, also known as the Ha'il Region, is one of the 13 provinces of the Kingdom of Saudi Arabia. The province accounts for roughly 2% of the population of the country and is named for its largest city, Ha'il. Other populous cities in the province include al-Ghazalah, Shinan and Baq'aa. The region is famous for the twin mountain ranges of 'Aja and Salma, and for being the homeland of historic symbol of curiosity and generosity, Hatim al-Ta`i.

The province is popular for hosting the geographically and historically important twin mountain ranges of 'Aja and Salma, which are now areas protected by the Saudi Wildlife Authority. In addition, multiple rock art sites can be found in the province, two sites of which have been added to the UNESCO World Cultural Heritage Site List; Jabal Umm Sinman near Jubbah and Jabal al-Manjur. Multiple old forts and castles can be found in the region, especially in and around the capital, Ha'il. Another important site in the province are the sandstone formations, such as the Nafud al-Kabir formation.

The area is known to have been inhabited since at least the Paleolithic period, with several archaeological sites dating back to 10000 BC to 7500 BC. Several sites with archaeological rock art and other artifacts have been found in the province. The province is inhabited by members of the Shammar tribe, who ruled the area and other areas surrounding the province from 1791 to 1922 as the Emirate of Jabal Shammar; when King Abdulaziz conquered the region.

The province is divided into 8 governorates, and more than two-thirds of the population of the city lives in the capital city of Ha'il. The incumbent Provincial Governor is 'Abdulaziz ibn Sa'ad al-Sa'ud. It is bordered, clockwise from the north, by the Northern Borders Province, Eastern Province, Qassim Province, Madinah Province, Tabuk Province and Al Jawf Province.

History

Prehistory 
Archaeological evidence indicates the continuation of human settlement in the Ha'il Province since prehistoric times. The sites dating to the Middle Paleolithic age discovered in and around Ha'il attest that the soil in the area could have held enough water to enable plant life during the period from 75000 BC to 5000 BC. A striking discovery in the province was that there are more archaeological sites dating back to the Paleolithic period than to the Neolithic. One reason given for this is that the climatic changes from a cold and humid climate in the Paleolithic period to the heat and drought of the Neolithic period and the resulting gradual change in vegetation cover from greenery to desertification led to mass migration to more habitable areas in the Fertile Crescent. Archaeologists have deduced that the availability of its water, the fertility of the soil, the abundance and distribution of pastures in different directions, and the moderate climate of the region, combined, made it a lot more hospitable than the surrounding Arabian Desert.

Neolithic sites are clearly scattered across the northern Arabian Peninsula. Several Neolithic artifacts found in the province date back to the period from 10000 BC to 7500 BC. The artifacts discovered in Hail can be distinguished from others found in Saudi Arabia by the abundance of rock drawings that vary between human and animal figures. The Neolithic period in Ha'il is distinguished by its different environments and diversity, as can be seen in the sandy banks of the valleys, the dune slopes and ancient lake deposits, including those discovered in Jubbah, northwest of Ha'il. Stone tools in separate areas of Ha'il also indicate that the people living in the area lived a life of hunting-gathering, rather than in permanent settlements.

Cultural evidence from the Copper Age (approximately 5500 BC) is most widespread within the Ha'il Province, and among the artifacts found in the area from this age are stone tools with flat sides in the form of scrapers, drills and cleavers. In addition to the discovery of a group of stone formations and circles that characterize the Copper Age, these stone installations indicate that life in this era was more settled than the life of hunting-gathering, which is a striking characteristic of a Neolithic society. Among the signs that prove these settlements are the presence of flint tools, vessels made of rough, unpolished clay and a group of rock inscriptions that together confirm the existence of human activity in the region in prehistoric times.

In May 2021, archaeologists announced that a 350,000-year-old Acheulean site named An Nasim in the Hail region could be the oldest human habitation site in northern Saudi Arabia. The site was first discovered in 2015 using remote sensing and palaeohydrological modelling. It contains paleolake deposits related with Middle Pleistocene materials. 354 artefacts, hand axes and stone tools, flakes discovered by researchers provided information about tool-making traditions of the earliest living man inhabited South-West Asia. Besides, Paleolithic artefacts are similar to material remains uncovered at the Acheulean sites in the Nefud Desert.

Up to and after the advent of Islam 

Part of the historic Najd region was inhabited by Arab tribes and influenced by the Nabataean people and later, the Ghassanids and Lakhmids.

By 633, under the rule of Abu Bakr, the Rashidun Caliphate consolidated the region. The Shammar tribe emerged to be the most powerful in the region in later years and by 1791, Prince Abdullah bin Ali al-Rasheed of the Shammar consolidated the region under his rule, whose state acted as a precursor to the Emirate of Jabal Shammar, which was formed in 1834 by the Rashidi dynasty. The Emirate of Jabal Shammar fought several wars against the new Saudi state to the south, supported by the Ottomans, but in 1921, King Abdulaziz of the House of Saud conquered its capital city, Ha'il, during the Unification of Saudi Arabia, and the region completely fell into Saudi hands by 1922.

Demographics

Population 
The 2017 Population Characteristics Surveys conducted by the Saudi General Authority for Statistics observed the population of the province to be 699,774 (2.19% of the entire kingdom), with Saudis constituting approximately 77% of the population, at 530,944 individuals; making the province the ninth-most populous in the kingdom. United Nations projections estimate the 2020 population of the capital of the province, the city of Ha'il, at 400,000; more than two-thirds of the population of the province lives in the city and the Ha'il Governorate, in which Ha'il is located, is the province's most populous governorate.

Administrative divisions and history

Governorates

Governors

References

External links
 A travel through the province of Hail, Splendid Arabia: A travel site with photos and routes

 

Provinces of Saudi Arabia

sv:Ha'il